Michael Reagan is an American composer, songwriter and music producer for film, television, and video games. His TV work includes The Powerpuff Girls, Chico Bon Bon: Monkey with a Tool Belt, and Bob Boyle's Wow! Wow! Wubbzy!. His film work includes Any Given Sunday, Odnoklassniki.ru: naCLICKay udachu starring Snoop Dogg, the original song "Heart and Soul" for Ripple Effect featuring Asdru Sierra from Ozomatli, and the song "Take The First Step" for the Sony Pictures / Jim Henson Studios feature film Elmo in Grouchland, which won a Grammy Award for Best Children's Soundtrack. Reagan is the voice of the Tarzan yell in the 1999 Walt Disney Studios film Tarzan.

His video game work include Square Enix' Life Is Strange: Before the Storm, Valhalla Game Studios Devil's Third, and Sony Interactive Entertainment's God of War, God of War II, God of War III, God of War: Chains of Olympus, and God of War: Ghost of Sparta, which won several awards including the Interactive Academy Award, Game Audio Network Guild's Music of the Year and Best Original Soundtrack. Other game projects include Conan, Twisted Metal: Black, NBA 2K8, Darkwatch, Rise of the Kasai and Brute Force.

Career
Reagan studied guitar, composition, and music synthesis at Berklee College of Music in Boston, Mass. He began his professional career as a sound designer at Soundelux, Hollywood.  Reagan's work was recognized with an Academy Award nomination for sound design in John Woo's Face/Off.  It was during this project that Reagan met director John Woo, and composers John Powell, Hanz Zimmer and other notable talent working at what is now known as Remote Control Productions (American company).

While continuing his career in sound design, Reagan began simultaneously writing and producing original songs for various films.  At the same time, Reagan began scoring top video games for Walt Disney Studios, Activision, Microsoft, Universal and Sony Computer Entertainment including the God of War and Twisted Metal Franchises, as well as iconic properties such as Conan, The Transformers, Darkwatch, Darksiders, Marvel's Spider-Man: Into the Spider-Verse and many others.

As film and television projects soon followed, Reagan found his way to a full-time career as a composer. First with the films Unbeatable Harold starring Henry Winkler, and Magic Laptop starring Snoop Dogg. Episodic television work soon followed, and to date Reagan has written the scores and songs for hundreds of television episodes including Bob Boyle's Wow Wow Wubbzy, Rovio's Angry Birds Toons series, Cartoon Network’s The Powerpuff Girls (2016 TV series), and the 2020 Netflix release of Chico Bon Bon: Monkey with a Tool Belt. Reagan is currently scoring the upcoming feature film: Abby's List: a Dogumentary, scheduled for release in 2021.

Discography

Composer

References

External links
 
 
 
 

Living people
Video game composers
American film score composers
American television composers
Songwriters from California
Year of birth missing (living people)
American male film score composers
American male songwriters